Mannheim School District 83 (D83) is a school district headquartered in Franklin Park, Illinois. It serves Franklin Park, Melrose Park, and Northlake. The school district was established in 1869 as a wooden building at the corner of Grand Avenue and Mannheim Road.

Schools
The sole middle school is Mannheim Middle School in Melrose Park.

Elementary schools:
 Roy Elementary School (Northlake)
 Scott Elementary School (Melrose Park)
 Westdale Elementary School (Northlake)

The preschool is Mannheim Early Childhood Center in Northlake.

Enger School in Melrose Park is an alternative school for students with disabilities.

References

External links
 

School districts in Cook County, Illinois